Patrick Piemonte is an American inventor, computer scientist and user interface designer best known for his contributions to the iPhone and iPad at Apple, for which he has received over 60 patents.

Career
Piemonte worked at Apple Inc. from 2008 to 2013 and from 2014 until 2016 as part of the early iPhone team and Special Projects Group, respectively. His contributions include location-based services, iPhone's Core Motion software that leverages the gyroscope and motion coprocessor, the iPhone digital compass with ability to view True North, geocoding services, Flyover interface, 3D maps interface, turn-by-turn navigation interface, multi-touch gestures for 2D and 3D interaction with a map, the grid line interface under a data-less map, and iPhone's night mode interface. He was responsible for 3D user interface research using the iPhone gyroscope which contributed to the development of new interface techniques in iOS, such as parallax.

For the 2010 Worldwide Developers Conference keynote, Piemonte and his colleagues developed the first mobile game to use iPhone's Core Motion software which Steve Jobs played onstage to demo the technology.

In early 2017, Piemonte co-founded and launched Mirage World, an app for creating shared immersive media on top of the real world using augmented reality, with content creator Ryan Staake.

References

Living people
Interface designers
Computer scientists
Human–computer interaction researchers
Apple Inc. employees
Carnegie Mellon University alumni
Purdue University alumni
Year of birth missing (living people)